The Committee on the Environment, Public Health and Food Safety may refer to:
 European Parliament Committee on the Environment, Public Health and Food Safety
 The former name of the current Canadian House of Commons Standing Committee on Environment and Sustainable Development